The Chief of Staff of the Armed Forces is the highest-ranking military officer in the military of Afghanistan (currently the Islamic Emirate Armed Forces), who is responsible for maintaining the operational command of the military.

List of chiefs
Abdul Karim Mustaghni was army chief of staff until the 1973 overthrow of the monarchy. In the late 1980s, during the communist regime,  served as army chief of staff, followed by Shahnawaz Tanai, from the Khalq faction of the PDPA (August 1988 – March 1990), who was succeeded by Mohammed Asif Delawar following the 1990 coup attempt, which was led by Tanai.

Afghan Armed Forces (Islamic Republic era)

Islamic Emirate Armed Forces

* Incumbent's time in office last updated: .

References

Bibliography
 

Afghan military officers
Afghanistan